The Fatherless and the Widow is the debut studio album by American band Sixpence None the Richer, released in 1994.

Track listing
All songs written by Matt Slocum, except "Spotlight" by T.J. Behling.
"Field of Flowers" – 2:37
"Spotlight" – 3:51
"The Fatherless and the Widow" – 4:44
"Musings" – 4:34
"Trust" – 3:25
"Falling Leaves" – 3:31
"Meaningless" – 5:08
"Soul" – 3:50
"An Apology" – 4:40
"Trust (Reprise)" – 4:02

Personnel 
 Leigh Bingham – vocals
 Matt Slocum – keyboards, guitars, bass, backing vocals (5)

Additional musicians
 Chris Dodds – drums
 Armand John Petri – percussion
 Joseph Rozier – acoustic piano (10), string arrangements (10)
 Bryan Eckenrode – cello (10)
 Alfred B. Frenning – cello (10)
 Robbie Hausman – cello (10)

Production 
 Tyler Bacon – executive producer 
 Peter Gavin Morkel – executive producer 
 Armand John Petri – producer, engineer, mixing 
 John Caruso – assistant engineer (10)
 Joe Brescio – mastering 
 Duncan Stanbury – mastering 
 Master Cutting Room (New York, NY) – mastering location 
 Jeff Spencer – art direction, design 
 Nosegrind Creative – art direction, design 
 Tony Gerber – CGI artwork, layout 
 Michael Wilson – photography

Notes 

Sixpence None the Richer albums
1994 debut albums
R.E.X. Records albums